John Morrow (April 19, 1865 – February 25, 1935) was an American attorney, politician, businessman, and educator who served as a member of the United States House of Representatives from New Mexico.

Early life and education 
He was born near Darlington, Wisconsin. He attended local public schools and the state normal university.

Career

Early career 
Morrow taught school in Wisconsin, Iowa, Nebraska, and New Mexico. He was the superintendent of public schools of Colfax County, New Mexico in 1892–1896. He studied law and commenced practice in Raton, New Mexico after being admitted to the bar in 1895.

Politics 
Morrow was a member of the New Mexico Territorial House of Representatives in 1897 and 1898 and the city attorney of Raton in 1900 and 1901. He was president of the board of education in 1903–1923. In addition, he was a delegate to the Democratic National Convention in 1908 and a regent of New Mexico Highlands University in Las Vegas, New Mexico (the former state normal institution) from 1921 to 1922. He was elected as a Democrat to the Sixty-eighth, Sixty-ninth, and Seventieth Congresses (March 4, 1923 – March 3, 1929) and was an unsuccessful candidate for re-election in 1928.

Later career 
After leaving Congress, he engaged in banking, had extensive ranch and livestock holdings, and was a large owner of real estate in Raton.

Death 
He died in Santa Fe, New Mexico in 1935 and was buried at the Fairmont Cemetery in Raton, New Mexico.

References

Bullis, Don. "New Mexico Historical Biographies" (Rio Grande Books 2011 Los Ranchos, New Mexico)

1865 births
1935 deaths
20th-century American politicians
School superintendents in New Mexico
Schoolteachers from New Mexico
Members of the New Mexico Territorial Legislature
People from Darlington, Wisconsin
People from Raton, New Mexico
Democratic Party members of the United States House of Representatives from New Mexico
Schoolteachers from Nebraska
20th-century American educators
Schoolteachers from Iowa
19th-century American educators
Schoolteachers from Wisconsin